The FBI's Ten Most Wanted Fugitives during the 1980s is a list, maintained for a fourth decade, of the Ten Most Wanted Fugitives of the United States Federal Bureau of Investigation.

FBI headlines in the 1980s
During the 1980s, the FBI added the names of the two longest-lasting profiles of the Top Ten Fugitives. The current longest member, Victor Manuel Gerena became the 386th fugitive to be placed on May 14, 1984, and is currently still at large. The FBI added, Donald Eugene Webb, on May 4, 1981, who remained on the list until March 2007 when the FBI, presuming his death, removed his name. Webb the second longest member of the list, remained on 25 years, 10 months and 27 days. The 1980s also brought the first man-and-woman couple listed together, who were FALN terrorist group associates Donna Jean Willmott and Claude Daniel Marks. The couple surrendered together seven years later, then pleaded guilty together to a Leavenworth prison breakout conspiracy from 1987.

Among other prominent fugitives in the decade were Mutulu Shakur, the stepfather of the later famed rapper Tupac Shakur, and also appearing was the sociopath Charles Ng, who had teamed up with the infamous Leonard Lake in as many as 25 sex-slave torture-murders at Lake's ranch in California. The boss of the Colombo crime family, Carmine Persico, also made the list in the 1980s.

The decade also was marked by the start of the popular Fox television program America's Most Wanted in 1988, which became a major new publicity venue for profiling and then the apprehension of many of the FBI's Top Ten Fugitives.

FBI 10 Most Wanted Fugitives to begin the 1980s
The FBI in the past has identified individuals by the sequence number in which each individual has appeared on the list. Some individuals have even appeared twice, and often a sequence number was permanently assigned to an individual suspect who was soon caught, captured, or simply removed, before his or her appearance could be published on the publicly released list. In those cases, the public would see only gaps in the number sequence reported by the FBI. For convenient reference, the wanted suspect's sequence number and date of entry on the FBI list appear below, whenever possible.

As the new decade opened, the following Fugitives from prior years still remained at large, as the members of the FBI's Ten Most Wanted list:

FBI Most Wanted Fugitives added during the 1980s
The most wanted fugitives listed in the decade of the 1980s includes (in FBI list appearance sequence order):

1980–1985

1986–1989

End of the decade
As the decade closed, the following were still at large as the Ten Most Wanted Fugitives:

One spot on the list of Ten remained unfilled from a capture late in the year 1989. It was filled the next month in 1990.

FBI directors in the 1980s
William H. Webster (1978–1987)
John E. Otto (1987)
William S. Sessions (1987–1993)

References

External links
Current FBI Top Ten Most Wanted Fugitives
FBI pdf source document listing all Ten Most Wanted year by year (removed by FBI)

1980s in the United States